Tenaya Darlington (born 1971) is an American writer as well as Associate Professor at Saint Joseph’s University in Philadelphia, Pennsylvania. Her general fields of professional interest include food writing, fiction, poetry, creative nonfiction, and journalism. She is the author of six books.

Life

She graduated from Beloit College, and Indiana University, with an M.F.A., in 1997.

She worked as a food critic, and writer for Isthmus Newspaper, the alternative weekly in Madison, Wisconsin, where she wrote a biweekly culture column about the bizarre, called “On the Loose.”.

She was a visiting writer at DePauw University.
She teaches at St. Joseph's University.

Her work has appeared in Bomb, Image Journal, Hayden's Ferry Review

Awards
 1999 National Poetry Series, for Madame Deluxe
 Great Lakes Colleges Association New Writer’s Award.

Blog
In 2010 Tenaya began a dairy diary on Blogger to go along with a class she was teaching. Tenaya is now an avid cheese blogger also known as Madame Fromage.     "Madame Fromage has just one goal, you see? To help you fall hopelessy in love with cheese. Just as she has."

Works

Poetry

Articles

Novel

Anthologies

Reviews
Some poets aren't satisfied with plain clothes or plain language, they turn their metaphors into absurdist imaging or trace an elliptical line of thought. But, sometimes, they simply paint their face perfectly seductive and then smear it, walk out in public with mad sexhair not just for show but for a sense of bawdy, over-the-top control of the world remembered/encountered. Tenaya Darlington is one such poet and her debut, Madame Deluxe, is full of such brash and brazen flaunt.

References

External links
"Tenaya Darlington Interviewed by Erin Bittman", Mary Interviews

1971 births
Living people
Beloit College alumni
Indiana University alumni
Saint Joseph's University faculty
DePauw University people
American women poets
21st-century American poets
American women academics
21st-century American women writers